Roel Brouwers (born 28 November 1981) is a Dutch former footballer who last played for Roda JC Kerkrade in the Dutch Eredivisie.

Club career
Brouwers played the majority of his professional career in Germany. He started at hometown amateur side Weltania Heerlen and had a few seasons with Roda JC before moving abroad to play for SC Paderborn 07. He then spent 9 years with Borussia Mönchengladbach, for whom he made his Champions League debut in September 2015 against Sevilla.

He rejoined Roda in summer 2016, only to finish his career in October 2016 after losing his place in the starting line-up and suffering minor injuries.

Personal life 
Although he was under contract at Borussia Mönchengladbach, Brouwers used to live with his wife and son in the Netherlands, in Voerendaal near the German border, 80 motorway kilometres located from Mönchengladbach.

References

1981 births
Living people
Sportspeople from Heerlen
People from Voerendaal
Dutch footballers
Association football central defenders
Roda JC Kerkrade players
SC Paderborn 07 players
Borussia Mönchengladbach players
Dutch expatriate footballers
Expatriate footballers in Germany
Dutch expatriate sportspeople in Germany
Eredivisie players
Bundesliga players
2. Bundesliga players
Footballers from Limburg (Netherlands)